Lois M. Leveen is an American writer, educator and historian based in Portland, Oregon.

Early life and education 
Leveen graduated from Harvard College, University of Southern California, and University of California, Los Angeles.

Writing 
Leveen published her first novel, The Secrets of Mary Bowser, in 2012. The novel is based on the life of Mary Bowser, a Virginia slave who became a spy for the Union Army. It was named one of The Oregonian's Top Ten Northwest Books of 2012, and has been optioned for film.

For her second novel, Juliet's Nurse, Leveen reimagined the story of Shakespeare's Romeo and Juliet from the point of view of the nurse. The audiobook, which was read by Nicola Barber, won an Earphones Award from AudioFile Magazine.

One of Leveen's essays is mentioned in CrossRoutes: The Meanings of "Race" for the 21st Century, a 2003 book.

Bibliography 

 The Secrets of Mary Bowser (2012) 
 Juliet's Nurse (2014)

References

External links 
 
 Curriculum vitae
 Leveen discusses The Secrets of Mary Bowser at the Pritzker Military Museum & Library on January 18, 2013
 

Living people
Educators from Oregon
American women educators
Writers from Portland, Oregon
American women writers
University of Southern California alumni
University of California, Los Angeles alumni
Harvard College alumni
Year of birth missing (living people)
21st-century American women